Aleksandar Miljković (born 26 February 1990) is a Serbian footballer who plays as a right back for Armenian Premier League club Pyunik.

Club career
Miljković has passed Partizan's youth academy after which he was transferred to FK Teleoptik to gain experience. He was promoted to Partizan senior squad along with Adem Ljajić during the 2008–09 season. He debuted against FK Čukarički on 26 October 2008. Later on, he was sent back to Teleoptik. In 2010, he was loaned to FK Metalac where he played five games and scored one goal. The next three seasons, Miljković spent as a standard member of Partizan. He also made 14 appearances for Partizan in the UEFA club competitions.

With Partizan, Miljković won four Serbian championship titles and two Serbian Cups.

On 21 June 2013, Miljković signed a four-year deal with Portuguese club Braga.

On 1 November 2018, Miljković joined Ekstraklasa side Miedź Legnica on a two-year-deal.

On 28 August 2019, Miljković signed for FC Alashkert. On 27 July, Miljković was released by mutual consent from his contract with Alashkert.

On 13 August 2022, Miljković signed for Pyunik.

International career
Miljković has been a member of the Serbia U19 and Serbia U21 national football teams. He debuted against Germany U19 on 31 March 2009. He made 17 appearances for both selections.

Career statistics

Club

Honours
Partizan
 Serbian SuperLiga (4): 2008–09, 2010–11, 2011–12, 2012–13
 Serbian Cup (2): 2008–09, 2010–11

References

External links
 Aleksandar Miljković at utakmica.rs
 

1990 births
Living people
People from Bor, Serbia
Serbian footballers
Association football defenders
Serbia youth international footballers
Serbia under-21 international footballers
FK Teleoptik players
FK Partizan players
FK Metalac Gornji Milanovac players
Serbian SuperLiga players
S.C. Braga players
S.C. Braga B players
RNK Split players
Primeira Liga players
Serbian expatriate footballers
Expatriate footballers in Portugal
Serbian expatriate sportspeople in Portugal
FC Amkar Perm players
Russian Premier League players
Expatriate footballers in Russia